Cuproxena quinquenotata is a species of moth of the family Tortricidae. It is found in Amazonas, Brazil.

References

Moths described in 1863
Cuproxena